Jean Bienvenue (24 June 1928 – 13 October 2018) was a Liberal minister under Robert Bourassa in the province of Quebec.

He was born in June 1928. Bienvenue graduated from Université Laval before he joined the Quebec bar in June 1952. He was later a member of several law firms. He was the son of Valmore Bienvenue, a lawyer and political figure, and Charlotte Langlois.

Bienvenue was elected an MNA in both 1966 and 1970 in Matane riding. When the Liberals formed the government in 1970, he was appointed deputy government House Leader from January 1971 to November 1976.  Bienvenue became Minister of State in May 1971, and then Minister of Immigration in February 1972.

In 1973 he defeated Jacques Parizeau in the Montreal riding of Crémazie.

He died in 2018 at age 90 in Quebec City.

References 

1928 births
2018 deaths
French Quebecers
Quebec Liberal Party MNAs
Université Laval alumni
Members of the Executive Council of Quebec